Dennis M. Canario (born August 18, 1960) is an American politician and a Democratic member of the Rhode Island House of Representatives representing District 71 since January 1, 2013. He is also the deputy majority leader of the Rhode Island House of Representatives. Prior to being elected to District 71, Dennis served on the Portsmouth Town Council from 2004 to 2010. During the 2008 session, Dennis served as the president of the town council.

Personal life
Dennis currently resides in Portsmouth, Rhode Island with his wife, Amy and daughter, Olivia. Dennis also has two sons, Dennis Canario, Jr. of Portsmouth, Rhode Island and Jonathan Canario of Boston, Massachusetts.

Education
He graduated in the 1978 class of the St. Andrew's School in Barrington, Rhode Island. Canario earned his associate degree in criminal justice from Roger Williams University.

Before Portsmouth Town Council
Dennis founded the Portsmouth Police Cadet Explorer Program and he was a Portsmouth Senior Citizens Advocate during time between 1997 and 2001.

June 2020

On June 12, 2020, Canario announced he wouldn't be seeking re-election in 2020.

Elections
2012 When District 71 Libertarian Representative Daniel P. Gordon left the Legislature and left the seat open, Canario was unopposed for both the September 11, 2012 Democratic Primary, winning with 513 votes (51.9%) and the November 6, 2012 General election, winning with 4,829 votes.

References

External links
Official page at the Rhode Island General Assembly
Campaign site

Dennis Canario at Ballotpedia
Dennis M. Canario at the National Institute on Money in State Politics

Place of birth missing (living people)
1960 births
Living people
American police officers
Democratic Party members of the Rhode Island House of Representatives
People from Portsmouth, Rhode Island
Roger Williams University alumni
Roger Williams University School of Law alumni
21st-century American politicians